Angoroj (Agonies) is a 1964 film. It is the first feature film to be produced entirely in Esperanto. It was directed and produced by Jacques-Louis Mahé, a friend of Raymond Schwartz who, under the pseudonym 'Lorjak', had previously produced a silent Esperanto publicity film before World War II titled Antaŭen! (Onwards!).

Overview 
At the start of the 1960s Mahé, a professional photographic and cinematic expert, invested in the production of the first fictional film in Esperanto. Using a scenario by Mahé himself, the actors of the Internacia Arta Teatro (International Arts Theatre) presented a crime story, set in the Parisian periphery of petty thieves and cheats. Other notable people who played parts in the film included Schwartz (the commissioner), Gaston Waringhien (the voice-over) and many from the environs of the contemporary Paris, including Michel Duc-Goninaz.

Production 
The film was produced from 1963 to 1964, but the market did not react favourably. Mahé, who lost a large sum of money, accused Universala Esperanto-Asocio of a boycott. At the highest point of his depression, he destroyed almost all copies: only two remain (acquired eventually by the Château de Grésillon and the British Esperanto Association, both already used) as well as the original, which LF-koop (Kooperativo de Literatura Foiro) rescued in 1991, distributing a 61-minute videotape.

See also
Incubus

External links

French crime drama films
Esperanto-language films
1964 films
Esperanto in France

ca:Angoroj